Smoke is the surname of:

 Albert Smoke (1894–1944), Canadian long-distance runner
 Franklin Smoke (1860–1937), Canadian politician
 Jeffrey Smoke (born 1977), American sprint canoer
 Richard Smoke (1944–1995), American historian, and political scientist
 William Smoke (born 1938), American sprint canoer, father of Jeffrey Smoke

See also
 Marcia Jones-Smoke (born 1941), American sprint canoer, former wife of William Smoke and mother of Jeffrey Smoke
Smoak, surname